Josef Schaupper (3 August 1963 – 11 November 2000) was an Austrian deaf alpine skier. He represented Austria at the Deaflympics in 1987, 1995 and 1999, winning 7 medals including a gold medal. He died in the Kaprun funicular railway fire on 11 November 2000, along with his fellow deaf skiers.

Career 
Schaupper made his debut at the 1987 Winter Deaflympics and competed on two further occasions. In his maiden appearance, he won 3 medals: gold medal in parallel slalom, silver medal in slalom and bronze medal in downhill.

After missing the 1991 Winter Deaflympics, he took part in the 1995 Winter Deaflympics, winning silver medals in the men's giant slalom and super giant events. In the 1999 Winter Deaflympics, he again won  silver medals in the men's slalom and super giant events.

Death  

Schaupper and his friends Sandra Mayr, Karl Hutegger and Stephan Mohr, who were also deaf skiers, were trapped and killed in a fire in an ascending train in the tunnel of the Gletscherbahn Kaprun 2 in Kaprun. The disaster killed 155 people. A memorial to Josef Schaupper was erected in 2011 in Goldegg.

References 

1963 births
2000 deaths
Austrian male alpine skiers
Deaf skiers
Austrian deaf people
Railway accident deaths in Austria
Alpine skiers at the 1987 Winter Deaflympics
Alpine skiers at the 1995 Winter Deaflympics
Alpine skiers at the 1999 Winter Deaflympics
Deaflympic gold medalists for Austria
Deaflympic silver medalists for Austria
Deaflympic bronze medalists for Austria